Arangum Aniyarayum is a 1980 Indian Malayalam film,  directed by P. Chandrakumar and produced by R. S. Prabhu. The film stars Sankaradi, Sukumaran, KPAC Sunny and Seema in the lead roles. The film has musical score by A. T. Ummer.

Cast
Sankaradi
Sukumaran
KPAC Sunny
Seema

Soundtrack
The music was composed by A. T. Ummer and the lyrics were written by Sathyan Anthikkad.

References

External links
 

1980 films
1980s Malayalam-language films
Films directed by P. Chandrakumar